Mark Shelton may refer to:
 Mark Shelton (Australian politician), Speaker of the Tasmanian House of Assembly
 Mark M. Shelton, American pediatrician and member of the Texas House of Representatives
 Mark Shelton (footballer), English footballer
 Mark Shelton, American musician known as a member of Manilla Road